Mexrenoic acid, or mexrenoate, is a synthetic steroidal antimineralocorticoid which was never marketed.

See also
 Mexrenoate potassium
 Mexrenone

References

Abandoned drugs
Antimineralocorticoids
Carboxylic acids
Methyl esters
Enones
Pregnanes
Spirolactones
Tertiary alcohols